The Alturas Plaindealer was a newspaper published in Alturas, California from the mid-19th to mid-20th centuries. In 1952 it merged with the Modoc County record to form the Modoc County record and Alturas plaindealer.

References 

Defunct newspapers published in California
Alturas, California
1952 disestablishments in California